The arrondissement of Saint-Martin-Saint-Barthélemy is a former arrondissement of France, formerly located in the Guadeloupe département, in the Guadeloupe région.  It had 3 cantons and 2 communes. It ceased to exist on 22 February 2007 when the communes of Saint-Martin and Saint Barthelemy were officially detached from Guadeloupe.

Composition

Cantons
The cantons of the arrondissement of Saint-Martin-Saint-Barthélemy were:
Saint-Barthélemy
 Saint-Martin 1st Canton
 Saint-Martin 2nd Canton

Communes
The communes of the arrondissement of Saint-Martin-Saint-Barthélemy were:

See also
 Cantons of the Guadeloupe department
 Communes of the Guadeloupe department

External links
Saint-Martin-Saint-Barthélemy on French National Institute of Statistics and Economic Studies site (INSEE, in French)

Arrondissements of Guadeloupe
Geography of Saint Barthélemy
Geography of the Collectivity of Saint Martin